Dingle, officially the Municipality of Dingle,  is a 3rd class municipality in the province of Iloilo, Philippines. According to the 2020 census, it has a population of 45,965 people.

The town is known for its baroque-architecture church and its archaeological cave sites, such as the Lapuz Lapuz Cave, famous for revealing hunter-gatherer lives of the ancient people of Panay.

History
Dingle started as a pre-colonial settlement of Sumandig, which was under the jurisdiction of Simsiman, a pueblo of Laglag. The settlement was also known as Sibucao, Ba-ong, and Orvat. The Augustinian priest, Fr. Francisco Manuel Blanco, first founded Dingle as a visita of Pototan in 1593. Dingle became independent on April 23, 1611. In 1629 however, it was annexed to Dumangas, Iloilo and to Dueñas, Iloilo in 1641 (until 1825). On August 16, 1850, by order of Governor General of the Philippines Antonio de Urbiztondo, Dingle again became independent and was officially named the town of Dingle. The first town head was Julio Dator (1823–1827). In 1865, Fr. Fernando Llorente ordered the construction of the Dingle Catholic Church which was completed in 1886.

During the second phase Philippine Revolution against Spain, during the Spanish–American War, Dingle staged the first armed uprising in the Province of Iloilo. Now known as the "Cry of Lincud", the revolt occurred in Barrio Lincud on October 28, 1898. Today the event is commemorated as a special non-working holiday. The leaders of the uprising were Adriano D. Hernández, Julio D. Hernández, and Nicolas Roces. Adriano Hernández later became a brigadier general in the Philippine Revolutionary Army. He then represented the province at the Malolos Congress. Later, he was appointed Director of the Bureau of Agriculture. Today, his statue stands inside the Philippine Army's Camp General Adriano D. Hernandez in Dingle, which is named in his honor.

Under the Americans, Dingle was annexed to Pototan, Iloilo, the latter being larger and more prosperous. Nonetheless, through the efforts of Gen. Adriano Hernandez, the separation of the town from Pototan was given impetus in 1907.

In 1954, the sitio of Nazuni was converted into a barrio and was added as a barangay of Dingle.

Geography
The topography of Dingle is relatively rolling hills and narrow plains from the Poblacion. The flat lands extend along the Jalaur River through its borderline to the southeast. This starts to roll upward from the Poblacion going to the north-west. From the west of the Poblacion rises the slopes, steep and mountainous. This indicates that the topography of Dingle meets a certain type-cropping pattern.

Climate

Barangays
Dingle is politically subdivided into 33 barangays.

 Abangay
 Agsalanan
 Agtatacay
 Alegria
 Bongloy
 Buenavista
 Caguyuman
 Calicuang
 Camambugan
 Dawis
 Ginalinan Nuevo
 Ginalinan Viejo
 Gutao
 Ilajas
 Libo-o
 Licu-an
 Lincud
 Matangharon
 Moroboro
 Namatay
 Nazuni
 Pandan
 Potolan
 San Jose
 San Matias
 Siniba-an
 Tabugon
 Tambunac
 Tanghawan
 Tiguib
 Tinocuan
 Tulatula-an
 Poblacion

Demographics

Economy

Education

Private Schools
Mater Carmeli School - Dingle
Goodnews Learning Center Inc.

Tertiary
Iloilo State College of Fisheries - Dingle Campus

Secondary
Calicuang NHS
Dingle NHS
Rufino G. Palabrica Sr. NHS
Tabugon NHS
Nazuni Summit Comprehensive National High School

Primary

Abangay ES
Agsalanan ES
Agustin Muyco ES (Lincud ES)
Agtatacay-Gutao ES (Agtatacay ES)
Alegria ES
Bongloy ES
Calicuang ES
Camambugan ES
Dingle Central ES (Dayot-Jalandoni ES)
Ilajas ES
Isabel Roces Memorial ES
Libo-o ES
Matangharon ES
Moroboro ES
Muyco-Daguro ES (Caguyuman ES)
Nazuni ES
Potolan ES
San Jose ES
San Matias ES (Licu-an ES)
Siniba-an ES
Sra. Consolacion Muyco Aportadera Memorial ES
Tabugon ES
Tinocuan ES
White ES

Infrastructure

Power
The Panay Diesel Power Plant located at Tinocuan and Tabugon, Dingle provides 110 megawatts of electricity to Panay. The power plant is operated by the National Power Corporation.

Water
Two natural springs, the Lubong-Tubig and Talinab, serve as water source for the Dingle-Pototan Water District. While the Jalaur Irrigation Dam, also known as Moroboro Dam, built in 1955, provides irrigation to the agricultural lands of Dingle and nearby towns.

Landmarks

Bulabog Putian National Park 

Bulabog Putian is the only limestone rock formation on Panay. It was designated a National Park through Congressional Bill No. 1651, and such is considered a "nationally significant area." It occupies a land area of 834.033 hectares covering five of the 33 barangays of Dingle.  The park contains 13 known caves namely: Lungib, Hapu-Hapo, Ma-arhong, Guiso, Maestranza, Linganero, Lapuz Lapuz, Ticondal, Butac, Tuco, San Roque, Pitong Liko and Nautod. The Maestranza Cave is historically important as it served as a hide-out of the revolutionary forces during the Spanish colonial period and on its stone walls are inscriptions of the revolutionary troops.

Mt. Manyakiya
Mount Manyakiya is a natural viewing deck that provides a panoramic view of Negros Island as well as the low lying towns of the province of Iloilo. Nautod Wall, one of the major rock-climbing destination in the Philippines, can be found here.

Water
Lake Bito
Jalaur River
Lubong-Tubig Spring
Talinab Spring

Historical
Memorial to the Cry of Lincud Heroes
Dingle Parish Church – Finished in 1886, this church, a fine example of Filipino baroque adaptation, is made of limestones from Bulabog Mountain, painstakingly carried by the early parishioners through narrow, steep, and dangerous trails to the present site.

Other landmarks 

 The Hanging Bridge is a ruined post-WWII bridge that traverses the Jalaur River.
 Camp Pasica is a 13-hectare Girl Scout Camp.
 Camp Hernandez is a 37-hectare military training camp of the Armed Forces of the Philippines named in honor of the revolutionary hero, Gen. Adriano D. Hernández.
Jalaur Irrigation Dam
 Museo de Dingle
 Welcome Sign

Culture

Festivals
The Dingle Town Fiesta is celebrated every 24th day of June in honor of its patron saint, John the Baptist.

The Pagdihon Festival is a celebration in commemoration of the Cry of Lincud, the first revolt against the Spaniards in Panay. It is held every 4th week of October.

Government

List of chief executives

Gobernadorcillos

Capitán municipal
In 1893, the Maura Law was passed to reorganize town governments with the aim of making them more effective and autonomous. The law changed the title of chief executive of the town from gobernadorcillo to capitán municipal.

Revolution Presidents

Early American Period Presidents

Capitán del barrio
Dingle was reduced to the status of barrio from 1903 to 1908 after it was merged with the Municipality of Pototan by virtue of Act No. 719.

Presidentes & vice presidentes municipal
The Municipality of Dingle was re-established in 1908 after Iloilo 4th District Assemblyman Adriano D. Hernández succeeded in persuading Governor-General James Francis Smith to issue an executive order separating Dingle from Pototan.

Municipal Mayors

Notable personalities

 General Adriano Dayot Hernández – Revolutionary Hero
 Guillermo Gómez Rivera – Filipino writer, journalist, poet, playwright, historian, linguist
 Merlie M. Alunan – Palanca Awardee for Literature
 Nancy Deaño – Olympic competitor
 Most Rev. Jose S. Palma, D.D., S.Th.D – current Archbishop of Cebu and former president of the Catholic Bishops' Conference of the Philippines

References

External links
 [ Philippine Standard Geographic Code]
 Philippine Census Information
 Local Governance Performance Management System

Municipalities of Iloilo
1593 establishments in the Spanish Empire